The roller hockey tournament at the 2001 World Games in Akita, Japan took place between the 17th and the 20th of August. A total of 56 athletes from 6 national teams entered the competition. The competition took place in Akita Prefectural Rink.

Competition format
A total of six teams played in round-robin system. Team with the most points is a winner.

Teams
  Australia 
  Brazil 
  Germany 
  Great Britain 
  Japan 
  Portugal

Results

Final ranking

References

External links
 World Skate
 Roller sports on IWGA website
 Results

2001
2001 World Games